Petrie Bowen Wells (born 4 August 1935), known as Bowen Wells, is a retired British Conservative Party politician who served as Member of Parliament (MP) for Hertford and Stevenage then Hertford and Stortford from 1979 until 2001. He was also Chair of the International Development Select Committee from 1997 until 2001.

Education
Wells was educated at St Paul's School in London, the University of Exeter, and Regent Street Polytechnic.

Member of Parliament

Wells was first elected in the 1979 general election as MP for Hertford and Stevenage, defeating Labour's Shirley Williams. After boundary changes in the 1983 general election, he served as MP for Hertford and Stortford until the 2001 general election when he retired.

From 1982 until 1983, Wells served in Prime Minister Margaret Thatcher's Government as Parliamentary Private Secretary (PPS) to Minister of State for Employment Michael Alison. He then served twice in John Major's Government; as PPS to Minister of State for Public Transport Roger Freeman from 1992 until 1994, and as a Lord Commissioner of the Treasury from 1995 until 1997.

Wells lost his position in government following the Labour victory in the 1997 general election. Soon after, he was made Chair of the newly formed International Development Select Committee. He remained in the post until his retirement in 2001.

Personal life 
Wells is married. He has two sons, Adam and Simon Bowen.

Sources
UK Politics: People in Parliament, 28 July 1998. 
Profile, guardian.co.uk. Accessed 19 January 2023.

External links 
 

1935 births
Living people
Conservative Party (UK) MPs for English constituencies
UK MPs 1979–1983
UK MPs 1983–1987
UK MPs 1987–1992
UK MPs 1992–1997
UK MPs 1997–2001
People educated at St Paul's School, London
Alumni of the University of Essex
Alumni of the University of Westminster